Ethan Cochran (born January 9, 1994) is an American discus thrower.

He won a silver medal at the 2011 World Youth Championships in Athletics.

Cochran attended Newport Harbor High School, where he played varsity football until suffering a concussion during his senior season, after which he decided to focus on his track career. He competed for the California Golden Bears between 2013 and 2016 where he broke numerous records which included setting the all-time record for discus throw as a freshman.

He was a USA Today All-American track and field selection in 2012.

Upon retiring from athletics, Cochran founded White Wire LLC a technology startup based in Sheridan, Wyoming.

References

External links

DyeStat profile for Ethan Cochran

1994 births
Living people
Sportspeople from Newport Beach, California
American male discus throwers
Newport Harbor High School alumni